San Joseph de Ocuya (also known as River Field Site) was a Spanish Franciscan mission built in the early 17th century in the Florida Panhandle, near the present-day town of Lloyd, Florida. It was part of Spain's effort to colonize the region, and convert the Timucuan and Apalachee Indians to Christianity. The mission lasted until the first decade of the 18th century, when it was destroyed, possibly by Creek Indians and the English.

The site where the mission stood was added to the U.S. National Register of Historic Places on May 7, 1973.

See also
Spanish missions in Florida

References

External links
 Jefferson County listings at National Register of Historic Places
 Jefferson County listings at Florida's Office of Cultural and Historical Programs

Apalachee
Archaeological sites in Florida
National Register of Historic Places in Jefferson County, Florida
Properties of religious function on the National Register of Historic Places in Florida
Spanish missions in Florida
Timucua